Vermont Route 103 (VT 103) is a  north–south state highway in southern Vermont, United States. It runs from U.S. Route 5 (US 5) in Rockingham in the east to US 7 in Clarendon near Rutland in the west. The Vermont Country Store's second branch is one attraction along the route, as well as the Okemo Ski Resort in Ludlow.

Route description
VT 103 is a major arterial road for Vermont, being the most direct path from Boston and southeastern New England to Rutland and the Green Mountains ski areas and attractions.  Although U.S. Route 4 is a shorter and slightly better road across the Green Mountains to Rutland, it is a direct east–west road intersecting Interstate 91 significantly north of the diagonal 103.  Numerous proposals to widen 103 into a two-lane freeway or similar limited-access roadway have failed, even though a substantial power company right of way shadows the road for much of its length.

VT 103 begins at U.S. Route 5 in Rockingham just east of Interstate 91 and just north of Bellows Falls.  From there, it interchanges with I-91 at exit 6 and proceeds northeast to a pair of intersections with Meetinghouse Road, a loop road connecting VT 103 to the Rockingham Meetinghouse. Farther northwest, the route passes by one of Vermont Country Store's two locations and intersects Williams Road and Lower Bartonsville Road, a pair of local roads leading to the Worrall Covered Bridge and the Bartonsville Covered Bridge, respectively. VT 103 continues as a wide sweeping road into Chester, Windsor County, where it briefly overlaps VT 11 and crosses the Williams River on a new bridge.

Just north of Chester, VT 103 passes through Stone Village, an area listed on the National Register of Historic Places. Here, houses made of local granite line both sides of VT 103. Outside of Stone Village, the road varies from a narrow and winding shoulder-less 2-lane between the river and mountains to a more wide-shouldered road. This variation remains until the village of Ludlow, where the route passes by the Ludlow Baptist Church and the Black River Academy near the village green. While VT 100 continues north and parallels the county line, VT 103 turns west and crosses into Rutland County.

Across the county line in Mount Holly, VT 103 passes within a few miles of the Crowley Cheese factory as it heads into the Shrewsbury village of Cuttingsville with even more variations in road quality.  Outside Cuttingsville, it proceeds through Clarendon, where it crosses over the conjoined Long and Appalachian Trails and intersects Airport and East Clarendon Roads, two local roadways leading, respectively, to the Kingsley and Brown Covered Bridges. Shortly after the junction with East Clarendon Road, VT 103 intersects VT 7B, the former routing of U.S. Route 7, before terminating at modern US 7 adjacent to the Rutland Airport, just south of Rutland.

Major intersections

References

External links

103
Transportation in Rutland County, Vermont
Transportation in Windham County, Vermont
Transportation in Windsor County, Vermont